Velociraptor is a genus of small dromaeosaurid theropod dinosaur and cousin of Deinonychus.

Velociraptor may also refer to:

 Velociraptor!, an album by English rock band Kasabian
 VelociRaptor, a series of high performance hard disk drives
 Australian band, featuring Jeremy Neale.

See also
 Raptor (disambiguation)